The Only Color That Matters Is Green is the first collaborative studio album by American emcee/producer duo Pace Won and Mr. Green. It was released on June 20, 2008, by Raw Poetix Records LLC. The album features guest appearances from Mary Lou, Cymarshall Law & KoshaDillz.

It was supported by two music videos, "Children Sing" and "Who I Am".

Critical reception 
The Only Color That Matters Is Green received positive reviews from critics. HipHopDX puts the album in their "The Top 25 Hip Hop Albums Of 2008" with rating 4.5/5.

Track listing

Personnel 
 Aaron Green – producer, mixing, recording (tracks 1-3, 7-12)
 Christopher Mir – layout, design
 Cymar Simmons – guest artist (track 8)
 Hans Dekline – mastering
 Jenz Cypher – recording (tracks 4-6)
 Jerome Derek Hinds, Jr. – main performer
 Mary Lou – guest artist (track 8)
 Rami Matan Even-Esh – guest artist (track 8)

References

External links 

2008 albums
Outsidaz albums